Paracechorismenus is a genus of flies in the family Stratiomyidae.

Species
Paracechorismenus albipes (Brunetti, 1907)
Paracechorismenus femoratus (Meijere, 1916)
Paracechorismenus guamae James, 1950
Paracechorismenus infurcatus (Meijere, 1907)
Paracechorismenus intermedius Kertész, 1916

References

Stratiomyidae
Brachycera genera
Taxa named by Kálmán Kertész
Diptera of Asia